Sud or SUD may refer to:

Places
 Sud (Chamber of Deputies of Luxembourg constituency), a constituency in Luxembourg
 Sud (department), an administrative subdivision of Haiti
 Sud Department (Ivory Coast), defunct administrative subdivision of Ivory Coast
 South Province, New Caledonia (French: Province Sud)
 Sud, Cidra, Puerto Rico, a barrio

People
 Anjali Sud (born 1983), Indian American businesswoman and the CEO of Vimeo
 Veena Sud, Canadian-born American television writer, director, and producer

Organizations and companies
 Solidaires Unitaires Démocratiques, a French group of trade unions

Transportation
Sud Aviation, a defunct French state-owned aircraft manufacturer
Sudbury & Harrow Road railway station, London, England (National Rail station code)

Arts, entertainment, and media
 Sud (band), a Filipino band
 Sud (1993 film), a film by Gabriele Salvatores
 Sud (1999 film), a Belgian-Finnish-French English-language documentary art film about the dragging death of James Byrd Jr.

Science and technology

 Single use device, a label used in single use medical device reprocessing
 Substance use disorder
 Sustainable drainage system
 'Sud, nickname for Alfa Romeo Alfasud

Other uses
 Ninlil, a Sumerian goddess originally called Sud

See also
 Sud - Muntenia (development region), a region in Romania
 South (disambiguation)
 Sudd, a wetland in southern Sudan
 Suds (disambiguation)